is an island in the Sea of Japan administered under Maizuru in Kyoto Prefecture. It is about 2 km from Kutsujima, a similar smaller island.  is located just midway between islands. A breeding ground for streaked shearwaters, the island was designated a Japanese natural monument (天然記念物, tennen-kinenbutsu) in 1924. It has also been recognised as an Important Bird Area (IBA) by BirdLife International. Currently, the island is designated as Kanmurijima-Kutsujima wildlife protection area and any landing is prohibited. The recreational diving service is available though.

History
According to records of Tango no kuni fudoki, Kanmurijima and Kutsujima are the remains of a much larger island which submerged following an earthquake in 701 A.D. The topography of the seafloor seems to support the claim, as the steep 60-metre cliff is located underwater off the eastern coast of Kanmurijima and Kutsujima, indicating a recent crustal fault.

See also

 Amanohashidate
 Kutsujima
 Desert island
 List of islands

References

 Kyoto Prefecture (in Japanese).

Islands of Kyoto Prefecture
Islands of the Sea of Japan
Uninhabited islands of Japan
Important Bird Areas of Japan
Seabird colonies